Young Socialists Switzerland or Swiss Socialist Youth colloquially called “Juso”, is a youth organization in Switzerland connected to the Social Democratic Party of Switzerland but legally independent and following a different political course from its mother party.

External links 
Official homepage
 Jungsozialist*innen Schweiz 
 Jeunesse socialiste suisse

References 

Youth wings of political parties in Switzerland
Youth wings of social democratic parties